Arno Volk (15 January 1914 – 7 July 1987)  was a German musicologist and music publisher.

Born in Würzburg, Volk studied at the University of Cologne under Karl Gustav Fellerer in 1943 with the dissertation Ernst Eichner. Sein Leben und seine Bedeutung für die Entwicklung der Kammermusik und der Solokonzerte.

Volk died in Ingelheim am Rhein at the age of 73.

External links 
 

20th-century German musicologists
German music publishers (people)
1914 births
1987 deaths
Writers from Würzburg
University of Cologne alumni